PT Boats Knights of the Sea is a PC computer game by Akella. It is a simulation in which the player operates a PT Boat during World War II. In this game, the player can choose to control a ship, a group of ships, or to control specific crew members separately.

References

2011 video games
Naval video games
Ship simulation games
World War II video games
Windows games
Windows-only games
Video games developed in Russia
Akella games